An Act to amend the Copyright Act may refer to one of several Canadian legislative acts:
An Act to amend the Copyright Act (38th Canadian Parliament, 1st Session)
An Act to amend the Copyright Act (39th Canadian Parliament, 2nd Session)
An Act to amend the Copyright Act (40th Canadian Parliament, 3rd Session)
An Act to amend the Copyright Act (41st Canadian Parliament, 1st Session)